Trigonarthris is a genus of flower longhorn beetles in the family Cerambycidae, containing the following species: The name is derived from the Greek τρίγωνον (trigōnon) meaning triangle and ἄρθρον (arthron) meaning joint.

Species
 Trigonarthris atrata (LeConte, 1850)
 Trigonarthris minnesotana (Casey, 1913)
 Trigonarthris proxima (Say, 1824)

References

External links
Genus Trigonarthris, BugGuide

Lepturinae